Jožef Pogačnik (October 19, 1866 in Podnart – August 18, 1932) was a Slovenian politician who served as Prime Minister of Slovenes within the Kingdom of Serbs, Croats and Slovenes from October 31, 1918 to January 20, 1919 under the reign of Peter I. He was a member of the Slovene People's Party.

References

1866 births
1932 deaths
People from the Municipality of Radovljica
Carniolan people
Slovene People's Party (historical) politicians
Members of the Austrian House of Deputies (1897–1900)
Members of the Austrian House of Deputies (1901–1907)
Members of the Austrian House of Deputies (1907–1911)
Members of the Austrian House of Deputies (1911–1918)
Members of the Diet of the Duchy of Carniola
Yugoslav politicians